The Programming Historian is a peer-reviewed academic journal of digital humanities and digital history methodology. This flagship resource for digital humanities research methods publishes tutorials that help humanities scholars learn a wide range of digital tools, techniques, and workflows to facilitate research and teaching. The original project was based upon a series of lessons written by William J. Turkel and Alan MacEachern of the University of Western Ontario in 2008. The project launched as an academic journal during the Digital Humanities 2012 conference in Hamburg.

The journal publishes in English, Spanish, French, and Portuguese. Openness is the cornerstone of this Diamond Open Access project: it is open source, has an open peer review model, and an open ethos to project planning. All content is open access and released under a Creative Commons CC-BY license, with no cost to authors or readers. This makes Programming Historian available around the world, including to readers in the Global South.

The project has twice won a "Digital Humanities Award". In 2016 it won "Best Series of Posts" for its English-language content. In 2017 it won "Best Series of Posts" for its Spanish-language content. In 2018, The Programming Historian en español, was the winner of ‘Mejor iniciativa formativa desarrollada durante el año 2018’, Humanidades Digitales Hispánicas Association. It also won the Canadian Social Knowledge Institute’s Open Scholarship Award 2020 and in 2021 it was awarded the Coko Foundation’s Open Publishing Award in the Open Content category. Programming Historian has also been involved in social issues in digital humanities, conducting a self-reflection and survey into gender biases in the project in 2015 in an attempt to encourage more participation from female authors and reviewers.

Programming Historian is indexed by the Directory of Open Access Journals. It is also listed among proprietary databases and other e-resources at Harvard University Library.

References

External links

Publications established in 2012
English-language journals
History journals
Multilingual journals
Creative Commons Attribution-licensed journals